The Waiotauru River is a river of the Wellington Region of New Zealand's North Island. It flows generally north from two branches, the Southern Waiotauru River and the Eastern Waiotauru (or Snowy) River. Both of these branches have their origins in the southwestern Tararua Range, with the Eastern branch having its origin on the slopes of Mount Hector.

See also
List of rivers of New Zealand

References

Rivers of the Wellington Region
Rivers of New Zealand